Ebru Uzungüney (born 13 May 1997) is a German-born Turkish footballer who plays as a defender for Eintracht Frankfurt III and the Turkey women's national team.

Playing career

Club
After playing in the juniors teams of OSC Vellmar in 2012–13 and of 1. FFC Frankfurt in 2013–14, Uzungüney became part of 1. FFC Frankfurt II between 2013 and 2016. In the 2015–16 season, she appeared in the top-level team of 1. FFC Frankfurt. In the 2016–17 season, she transferred to TSV Schott Mainz in the German 2nd Women's Football Bundesliga South.

International

She was admitted to the Turkey women's national football team and debuted in the Goldcity Women's Cup 2017 against Romania on 1 March 2017. She played in the 2019 FIFA Women's World Cup qualification – UEFA preliminary round – Group 4 match against Montenegro.

References

1997 births
Living people
Citizens of Turkey through descent
Turkish women's footballers
Women's association football defenders
Turkey women's international footballers
Sportspeople from Kassel
Footballers from Hesse
German women's footballers
German people of Turkish descent
2. Frauen-Bundesliga players
Frauen-Bundesliga players
1. FFC Frankfurt players